Bedlam Ballroom is a studio album by the swing revival band Squirrel Nut Zippers, released in 2000. It followed several major personnel changes. The album reflects a stylistic shift, with the band incorporating a broader ranges of styles, instrumentation, and production approaches. The band broke up after the release of the album, eventually reuniting in 2007.

The album peaked at No. 195 on the Billboard 200.

Critical reception
Exclaim! wrote that the band have "abandoned their adherence to '30s recording techniques, and though a bit of the charm is lost, thankfully these Zippers ain't slick." CMJ New Music Monthly wrote that the album finds SNZ "nearly as eclectic as ever, but more generic too." Variety thought that the album "can easily be considered their best for, if nothing else, they reclaim a time when music was unsure of itself, an era when Louis Armstrong had given up on the music of his youth to build a wider audience through pop numbers and show tunes."

Track listing
All songs written by Jimbo Mathus except where noted.

 "Bedbugs"  – 3:12
 "Baby Wants a Diamond Ring"  – 3:25
 "Do What?"  – 2:42
 "Bent Out of Shape"  – 2:47
 "Stop Drop and Roll"  – 2:58
 "Hush"  – 4:12
 "It All Depends"  – 3:47
 "Bedlam Ballroom" (Stacy Guess)  – 2:15
 "Just This Side of Blue"  – 3:08
 "Don't Fix It"  – 3:33
 "Missing Link"  – 3:21
 "Bedlam Reprise"  – :21
 "Do It This a Way"  – 2:33

Details
 "Bedlam Ballroom" first appeared on the band's 1997 EP Sold Out as a live recording.
 Mathus sings lead vocals on tracks 1, 3, 5, 10, and 13; Katharine Whalen sings lead on tracks 2, 4, 6, 7, and 9.
 Most editions of the CD case have a lenticular cover. The cover artwork was created by artist Michael Doret.

Personnel
 Jimbo Mathus – vocals, guitar, bass guitar, Chamberlin, ukulele, banjo
 Katharine Whalen – vocals, banjo, baritone ukulele
 Tim Smith – alto, baritone, and tenor saxophones, flute, background vocals
 Reese Gray – piano, tack piano, Hammond B3 organ
 David Wright – piano, Wurlitzer, trombone, background vocals
 Je Widenhouse – trumpet
 Stuart Cole – bass guitar, background vocals
 Chris Phillips – drums, percussion, gong

Additional musicians
 Andrew Bird – violin
 Mike Napolitano – guitar
 George Rossi – bass
 Gabo Tomasini – congas
 Giustino Riccio – timbales
 Greg Humphreys – background vocals

References

2000 albums
Squirrel Nut Zippers albums